Lindbrook is an unincorporated community in central Alberta in Beaver County, located  north of Highway 14,  southeast of Edmonton.

It was the location of the remains of formerly unidentified Canadian murder victim Gordon Edwin Sanderson, previously known as Septic Tank Sam, Sam Doe and Tofield John Doe, who was found in a septic tank in 1977. His remains were identified in January 2021, and his identity was revealed six months later.

References

Localities in Beaver County, Alberta